Manfred Mölgg (born 3 June 1982) is an Italian former World Cup alpine ski racer. He specialized in the technical events of slalom and giant slalom.

Mölgg's younger sister Manuela is also a former alpine racer with ten World Cup podiums.

Biography
Born in Bruneck, South Tyrol, Mölgg made his World Cup debut in January 2003 at Bormio. As of mid-January 2021, he has 20 World Cup podiums with three victories, all achieved in slalom. Mölgg won the World Cup season title in slalom in 2008, and finished fourth in the overall standings, the best result for an Italian since Kristian Ghedina finished fourth overall in 2000.

Mölgg has won three medals at the World Championships; a silver in slalom in 2007, a bronze in slalom in 2011, and a bronze in giant slalom in 2013.

On 11 January 2020 Mölgg suffered damage to his anterior cruciate ligament during a race at Adelboden, but returned to competition during the 2021 season.

World Cup results

Season titles

Season standings

Race podiums
 3 wins – (3 SL)  
 20 podiums – (3 GS, 16 SL, 1 SC)

World Championship results

Olympic results

See also
 Italian skiers who closed in top 10 in overall World Cup

References

External links

 Italian Winter Sports Federation – (FISI) – alpine skiing – Manfred Moelgg – 
 Fischer Skis – alpine racing – Manfred Mölgg
  – 

1982 births
Italian male alpine skiers
Alpine skiers at the 2006 Winter Olympics
Alpine skiers at the 2010 Winter Olympics
Alpine skiers at the 2014 Winter Olympics
Alpine skiers at the 2018 Winter Olympics
Olympic alpine skiers of Italy
FIS Alpine Ski World Cup champions
Alpine skiers of Fiamme Gialle
Sportspeople from Bruneck
Ladin people
Living people